Poor Souls was a Scottish band who had a hit in the UK, broke up and then re-emerged as a Canadian band who recorded for the Quality Records label, and two hits in 1970 with "Lookin’ Round", and "Comin' Round". They also had another with "Land of the Few".

Background
The group's history goes back to Dundee, Scotland when a group called The Johnny Hudson Hi-Four aka The Hi-Four was formed. When another musician, Chick Taylor came on board, the name was changed to The Poor Soul. The UK line up consisted of John Moran (aka Johnny Hudson) on guitar & vocals, Doug Martin on bass & vocals, Chick Taylor on guitar & keyboards and John Casey on drums & vocals. 

After sigining with Decca in 1965, they recorded the single, "When My Baby Cries" which was released in June that year on Decca F 12183. The song was a climber for the week ending, Sunday 11th July 1965.

In 1966, they were signed to ALP Records. In July, they had chart success with "Love Me". The group toured the US military bases in East Anglia. In late 1966 the label went into receivership.

The group later went to Rome and played there for a while before breaking up in 1967. Three members, John Moran, Chick Taylor and John Casey went to Canada and settled in Toronto, recording for the Quality label.

Career

Recordings
In 1970, the Canadian group had the single, "Lookin’ Round" bw "Scarecrow" released on Quality 1959X. 
For the week ending July 4, the single peaked at #3 in the Top 50 MAPL Canadian chart. It also peaked at #28 on July 11 in the RPM 100 singles chart.

They followed up with the similarly-titled single, "Comin’ Round" bw "Workin’ Man" on Quality 1980X. The group was pictured with CKFH's John Donabie in the June 20 issue of RPM Weekly. At that time their single was at #73 in the RPM 100 chart.  The single which was produced by Barry Keane had the label behind it in an interesting promotion. In a promotion that was described as an attention-getter, Canadian radio personalities were sent an engraved tin cup and pencils with "give to the poor souls" on the cup. Don O'Neil the program director of CHEX contacted Lee Farley of Quality Records to let him know that it worked. This exercise paid off for the group in the charts.  For the week ending October 31, the single peaked at #14 on the Top 30 MAPL Canadian chart. It also entered the RPM 100 Singles chart at #76.

In 1971, "Land of the Few" bw "No More" was released on Quality 1998X. On the week ending June 5, it was at #71 in the RPM 100 Singles chart.

Venues
Along with Rotary Connection, Brutus and Chimo!, they were booked to appear at the Midsummer Night's Rock Fest which ran from Fri Jun 26, 1970 - Sun Jul 05, 1970 in Michigan. Later that year they were booked to appear at the Rock Hill Rock-In festival that ran from September 5 to September 6 that year. Other groups that were booked to appear there were Sound Spectrum from London, Ontario,  Mud Flat from Toronto, Madrigal from Hamilton and April from Orangeville.

In 1971, Poor Souls along with Leigh Ashford, Bruce Cockburn and Tim Hardin were the acts to play an April 4th benefit concert for group Srynx who lost most of their equipment in a fire.

Break up
The group broke up after John Moran's wife died in an automobile accident.

Later years
By 1973, John Moran was signed to Columbia Records. He had recorded an album, Come Join Me and had released a single of the same name which was in the progressive rock mode.

Discography

Members

UK
 John Moran (aka Johnny Hudson) - guitar, vocals
 Doug Martin - bass, vocals
 Chick Taylor - guitar, keyboards
 John Casey - drums, vocals

Canada
John Moran - guitar, vocals
 Mike McDonald - guitar
 Martin Soldat - keyboards
 John Slorach - bass
 Tommy Frew drums
 Ron Ray - drums (replaced Tommy Frew)

Further reading
 OF THE WORLD, April 11, 2010 - POOR SOULS 45RPM 7" SINGLE-1970-CANADA-QUALITY LOOKIN' ROUND / SCARECROW

References

External links
 Discogs: Poor Souls (Scotland)
 Discogs: Poor Souls (Canada)

Canadian pop music groups
Quality Records artists